Concentration 20 is the third studio album by Japanese singer Namie Amuro, released July 24, 1997 by Avex Trax. The album's genre is a fusion of styles including pop, dance and rock. Unlike Amuro's previous effort, Sweet 19 Blues, which primarily had lyrics written by Tetsuya Komuro, Concentration 20s lyrics were mostly written by Marc Panther. Komuro did, however, compose and arrange most of the album's songs and wrote the lyrics to three of them, it was Namie's second solo album since the beginning in 1997.

After Amuro's 1996 album Sweet 19 Blues sold in excess of three million copies in Japan and for a brief period was even the best-selling Japanese album of all time, recording for a follow-up album began. Much of the recording of Concentration 20 was done in the United States, primarily in Los Angeles, California, The album received positive reviews upon release and as well winning the Asia Association Music Prize Awards 

"A Walk in the Park" was released as the album's lead single on November 27, 1996. It was very successful, becoming Amuro's fourth number one single and fourth million-seller. The second single, "Can You Celebrate?", was released on February 19, 1997. Used as the theme song for the TV drama Virgin Road, it was an unprecedented commercial success: It sold over 2.7 million physical copies and remains the best-selling physical single by a female soloist in Japanese history, becoming Amuro's fifth number one single and fifth million-seller. It charted for forty-nine weeks and was certified double Million by the RIAJ, her first and only single to receive such a certification. A re-release for Christmas 1997 sold over 400,000 copies itself. The rock-infused third single, "How to Be a Girl", reached number one and sold over 770,000 copies, becoming Amuro's sixth number one single.

The album was a big commercial success. The album entered the Oricon albums chart at number one with first-week sales of 824,980 copies. It charted for 28 weeks, and was the seventh best-selling album of the year, selling nearly two million copies. Combined with the sales of its singles, Concentration 20 has sold around 4.5 million copies.

 Background 
Two months earlier, Amuro had been touring Japan on the Namie Amuro tour 1997 A Walk in the Park. Her previous album, Sweet 19 Blues became the biggest selling album of all time when it was released.

The same month that the album was released, Amuro toured Japan's four domes in support of it. A few months after the tour, she would announce her pregnancy and pending maternity leave.

 Style and artwork 
The album embodies an array of styles including pop, rock and even some reggae. Unlike her previous album which was heavy on the pseudo-R&B side, this album was practically void of it. Concentration 20 took on a more electronic style similar to that of her producer's group, globe. Some argue that the album isn't really a reflection of Amuro, but just goes to demonstrate the talent of Tetsuya Komuro.

Opening the album is the industrial rock influenced, "Concentration 20 (make you alright)." The song was unlike anything she had previously released and really embodies the diversity within this project. "Me Love Peace!!" was Amuro's first attempt at reggae style music. She would not attempt a similar style again until Queen of Hip-Pop (2005) was released featuring some songs in dancehall and reggaeton fashion. Two of the singles from the album, "A Walk in the Park" and "Can You Celebrate?" appear on the album subtly remixed. Perhaps the one song that does demonstrate how much of this album was Komuro is "I Know..." The song is an instrumental track performed solely by him.

The cover artwork depicts Namie in a stylish dress that was designed in Tokyo and her eyes we're closed that poses her wraps on a curtain cut lines.

 Singles 
The singles from this album were very successful, two were million sellers and they reached the top spot of the charts.

 "A Walk in the Park" 
Released four months after the massive success of her first studio album Sweet 19 Blues, it became her fourth number one and million selling single. The single spent 7 weeks into the top 5 and 8 weeks in Top 10 totally.Oricon Weekly Singles Chart of December 16th, 1996Oricon Weekly Singles Chart of December 30th, 1996Oricon Weekly Singles Chart of January 20th, 1997 She performed the song at the Japan Cable Awards in December 1996 and at the Japan Gold Disc Awards in February 1997. "A Walk in the Park" was the 13th best selling single of the year 1997.

 "Can You Celebrate?" 
Amuro began the year 1997 with her defining single and biggest success to date. The song, a gospel influenced ballad, was released as the second single from the album. It opened at the top spot with over 800,000 copies sold in its first week, the highest first week sales for a single at that time and the 8th highest opening sales of all times for a single in Japan. It spent two consecutive weeks at #1,7 weeks in the top 5 and 8 weeks in Top 10 totally. It was charted for 40 weeks. "Can You Celebrate?" was the biggest selling single of 1997  and is the 14th best selling single in Japanese music history  with sales of over 2.5 million copies. A remix single of the song was also released to commemorate Namie's wedding with Sam and was also successful with about 500,000 units sold. In December 1997, the song helped her to win the Best Single Award at the 39th Japan Record Awards.

 "How to Be a Girl" 
The third and last single from the album was released in May 1997. "How to Be a Girl" is Namie's first attempt at rock music. The single still managed to be a commercial success, spending two consecutive weeks at #1 and selling over 770,000 copies, included over 300,000 copies purchased in its opening week. How to Be a Girl was also the 23rd best selling single of 1997.

 Tie-ups and theme songs 
"A Walk in the Park" and "Can You Celebrate?" were both theme songs for Maxell UD commercials and "Whisper" was used as the background music for the Maxell MD74 commercial.

"Can You Celebrate?" was also the theme song of the Japanese dorama Virgin Road.

"How to Be a Girl" was used as background music in four commercials for Sea Breeze products. The first CM was promoting a sun lotion, the second a shampoo, the third a deodorant and the last a moisturizer.

"No Communication" was used as background music in a commercial for the DyDo Mistio drinks.

 Commercial performance 
Concentration 20 debut at #1 with 824,980 copies sold (Namie's 3rd best first week sales for an album). It was again at the top spot in its 2nd week with 362,440 copies sold. The album stayed in the top 10 for 7 weeks and in the top 20 for 9 weeks. It sold over 1.9 million copies during its chart run and more than 2 million copies in total.

 Track listing 

 Personnel 
 Musicians 
 Namie Amuro – vocals, background vocals
 Lynn Mabry – background vocals
 Valerie Mayo – background vocals
 Akio Togashi – background vocals, keyboard
 Will Wheaton Jr. – background vocals
 Cozy Kubo – keyboard
 Tetsuya Komuro – backing vocals, guitar, keyboard, synthesizer
 Kazuhiro Matsuo – bass, guitar
 Kenji Sano – bass
 Ataru Sumiyoshi – bass
 Michael Thompson – guitar

 Production 
 Producers – Tetsuya Komuro
 Mixing – Eddie Delena
 Vocal direction – Tetsuya Komuro, Kenji Sano
 Photography – Itaru Hirama
 Art direction – Tycoon Graphics

 Charts Album' - Oricon Sales Chart (Japan)

References 

Namie Amuro albums
1997 albums
Avex Group albums
Albums produced by Tetsuya Komuro